Gaëtan Charbonnier (born 27 December 1988) is a French professional footballer who plays as a forward for  club Saint-Étienne.

Club career
Born in Saint-Mandé, Charbonnier started his career at Championnat de France Amateur side Châtellerault in the 2007–08 season, his debut season impressing enough to be taken on by Paris Saint-Germain. While playing the 2008–09 season with PSG's reserve team, he was unable to make the first team.

Charbonnier signed a four-year contract in June 2009 for Ligue 2 side Angers where he played three seasons in Ligue 2. Each season saw him increase his goal tally – three in 2009–10, eight in 2010–11, and 12 in 2011–12 –, reaching a total of 23 goals in 90 matches.

His goal return landed him a move on 20 June 2012 to reigning Ligue 1 champions Montpellier where he signed a four-year contract. The transfer fee paid to Angers was reported as €1.5 million. The transfer was announced the same day along with Toulouse defender Daniel Congré. In August 2013, Charbonnier joined fellow Ligue 1 side Reims after only one season with Montpellier.

On 16 December 2022, Charbonnier returned to Ligue 2 to sign for Saint-Étienne on a contract until the end of the 2022–23 season.

Career statistics

Honours
Individual
UNFP Ligue 2 Team of the Year: 2021–22

References

External links
 

1988 births
Living people
People from Saint-Mandé
Footballers from Val-de-Marne
French footballers
Association football forwards
Ligue 1 players
Ligue 2 players
Championnat National players
Championnat National 2 players
Montpellier HSC players
SO Châtellerault players
Paris Saint-Germain F.C. players
Angers SCO players
Stade de Reims players
Stade Brestois 29 players
AJ Auxerre players
AS Saint-Étienne players